Pemba Dorje Sherpa is a Sherpa from Beding, Rolwaling Valley, Dolkha, Nepal. He claims to have made the fastest ever ascent of Mount Everest on 21 May 2004, taking eight hours and ten minutes. The record was confirmed by Nepal's tourism ministry. His record has now been rejected by the Nepal Supreme Court, the Nepal Ministry of Tourism, and Guinness World Records. His record was also stripped by the Ministry of Culture, Tourism and Civil Aviation.

Kamal Singh previously set a record for the fastest summit of 12 hours and 45 minutes in 2003, only to see it broken by Lakpa Gelu Sherpa three days later who set a new record of 10 hours 56 minutes.

See also
List of Mount Everest summiteers by number of times to the summit

References

Year of birth missing (living people)
Living people
People from Dolakha District
Sherpa summiters of Mount Everest
Nepalese mountain climbers
Nepalese Buddhists
Nepalese summiters of Mount Everest